Acushnet is a town in Bristol County, Massachusetts, United States. The population was 10,559 at the 2020 census.

History 
Acushnet was first settled in 1659. It has been included as a part of three separate towns throughout its history. It was formerly the northeastern section of the town of Dartmouth, as well as Old Dartmouth, which included the towns of Westport, New Bedford, and Fairhaven. In 1787, New Bedford separated from Dartmouth, and included the lands of Fairhaven and Acushnet. In 1812, Fairhaven was incorporated as a separate town, again including the lands of Acushnet.  Finally, the town was officially incorporated in 1860. The name "Acushnet", which is also the name of the river the town lies on, comes from the Wampanoag Cushnea, meaning "peaceful resting place near water", originally designating the fact that the tribe which sold the land to the Puritans inhabited the lands leading up to the river.

In 1841, Herman Melville joined the crew of the whaler Acushnet.  He later wrote about his travels at sea culminating in the novel Moby Dick.

In 1910, the Acushnet Process Company (now the Acushnet Company), was founded in the town, and continues to be one of Southeastern Massachusetts's most enduring industries.  The Acushnet Company owns the Titleist brand name, under which golf balls, golf clubs, and other golf paraphernalia are marketed.

Geography
Acushnet is bordered to the east and northeast by Rochester, to the southeast by Mattapoisett, to the south by Fairhaven, to the west by New Bedford, and to the northwest by Freetown. The town line between Acushnet, Rochester and Mattapoisett forms a portion of the border between Bristol and Plymouth counties.

Acushnet lies along the Acushnet River and its tributaries, including the Keene River and Squinn Brook, which feed the New Bedford Reservoir, in turn feeding the Acushnet. The Acushnet River is the town line between it and New Bedford south of Main Street. There are several other ponds in the town, including Hamlin's Mill Pond (along the Acushnet), East Pond and a portion of Tinkham Pond, which lies along the Mattapoisett town line. Most of the town's population lies along the New Bedford line, with the biggest area being in the southwest corner of the town, near the town hall.

Surrounding communities

Transportation

A short,  stretch of Route 105 passes through the northeast corner of town, both entering and exiting through Rochester. Otherwise, the town contains no state or federal highways.  Route 18 and Route 140 both pass to the west of the town, with the former passing within feet of the town line as it enters Freetown. Interstate 195, the nearest interstate to the town, passes just south of the town through Fairhaven, with the nearest exits being Exits 16–18.

SRTA operates a short bus route through the southern part of town, which links to Fairhaven. There is no rail service or airports within the town. The Middleborough/Lakeville Line of the MBTA Commuter Rail system is currently in the process of expanding their route to end in neighboring New Bedford. New Bedford also has the nearest airport, the New Bedford Regional Airport. The nearest airport with national service is T.F. Green Airport in Rhode Island,  to the west.

Demographics

As of the census of 2000, there were 10,161 people, 3,793 households, and 2,837 families residing in the town. The racial makeup of the town was 97.20% White, 0.42% African American, 0.17% Native American, 0.17% Asian, 0.02% Pacific Islander, 0.78% from other races, and 1.25% from two or more races. Hispanic or Latino of any race were 0.79% of the population. Acushnet's population is 32% of Portuguese ancestry, 15% of French Ancestry, 12% of French Canadian ancestry and 10% of English ancestry.

There were 3,793 households, out of which 32.7% had children under the age of 18 living with them, 62.8% were married couples living together, 8.6% had a female householder with no husband present, and 25.2% were non-families. 21.1% of all households were made up of individuals, and 10.4% had someone living alone who was 65 years of age or older.  The average household size was 2.68 and the average family size was 3.13.

In the town, the population was spread out, with 23.4% under the age of 18, 6.9% from 18 to 24, 29.3% from 25 to 44, 25.5% from 45 to 64, and 14.9% who were 65 years of age or older.  The median age was 40 years. For every 100 females, there were 95.9 males.  For every 100 females age 18 and over, there were 93.0 males.

The median income for a household in the town was $51,500, and the median income for a family was $58,722. Males had a median income of $38,709 versus $28,649 for females. The per capita income for the town was $21,753.  About 1.9% of families and 3.8% of the population were below the poverty line, including 2.2% of those under age 18 and 9.3% of those age 65 or over.

Government
Acushnet uses the town meeting form of government, with open town meetings and the Board of Selectmen leading the Town Administrator.  The town has its own police force, and two fire stations, near the population center of town and in the northeast corner of town.

On the state level, Acushnet is represented in the Massachusetts House of Representatives by Robert Koczera, and in the Massachusetts Senate by Mark Montigny. On the federal level, Acushnet is part of Massachusetts's 9th congressional district, which is represented by William R. Keating; it is represented in the United States Senate by Elizabeth Warren and Ed Markey.

Library

"The town of Acushnet established a free library in 1896." The town's Russell Memorial Library, dedicated to a member of the prominent Russell family of New Bedford, lies in the town's population center. In fiscal year 2008, the town of Acushnet spent 0.87% ($189,813) of its budget on its public library—some $18 per person. On December 5, 2015, Russell Memorial Library closed its doors to relocate to the former Marie S. Howard School on Middle Road. The Acushnet Public Library opened on December 21, 2015.

Education
For elementary school Acushnet is in the Acushnet School District. The town has two schools, the Acushnet Elementary School, with grades from preschool to 4th grade, and the Albert F. Ford Middle School, with grades 5th to 8th, both located near the geographic center of town.

High school students then attend Fairhaven High School and Academy, of the Fairhaven School District in the south; or New Bedford High School of the New Bedford Public Schools.

High school students may also choose to attend Old Colony Regional Vocational Technical High School,  Bristol County Agricultural High School or any other local private high school.  The town is also home to Saint Francis Xavier School, a private Catholic school serving kindergarten through eighth grade.

Notable people

 Pat Flynn, Frontman of Straight Edge Hardcore band Have Heart
 Antonio Gattorno (1904–1980), Leader in the Cuban Modern Art
 Gideon Nye (1812–1888), merchant in the China trade
 Clement Nye Swift (1846–1918), painter
 Dani Ryan, semi-finalist on Ink Master, season 12

References

External links

Official town web page
Standard-Times Acushnet page

 
Providence metropolitan area
Towns in Bristol County, Massachusetts
Towns in Massachusetts